The 1945 Coupe de France Final was a football match held at Stade Olympique Yves-du-Manoir, Colombes on May 6, 1945, that saw RC Paris defeat Lille OSC 3–0 thanks to goals by André Philippot, Pierre Ponsetti and Oscar Heisserer.

Match details

See also
Coupe de France 1944-1945

External links
Coupe de France results at Rec.Sport.Soccer Statistics Foundation
Report on French federation site

Coupe De France Final
1945
Coupe De France Final 1945
Coupe De France Final 1945
Sport in Hauts-de-Seine
Coupe de France Final
Coupe de France Final